Enamel infractions are microcracks seen within the dental enamel of a tooth. They are commonly the result of dental trauma to the brittle enamel, which remains adherent to the underlying dentine. They can be seen more clearly when transillumination is used.

Enamel infractions are found more often in older teeth, as the accumulated trauma is greatest.
Enamel infractions can also be found as a result of iatrogenic damage inadvertently caused by instrumentation during dental treatments.

Treatment
Minor infraction may not require any treatment, however major infraction may require treatment including smoothing, fluoride treatment and crown restoration.

References

Dental enamel
Acquired tooth pathology